Grails may refer to:
Grails (band) is an American instrumental rock band
Grails (framework) is an open source web application framework

See also
Grail (disambiguation)